In Norse cosmology, Álfheimr (Old Norse: , "Land of the Elves" or "Elfland"; anglicized as Alfheim), also called "Ljósálfheimr" ("home of the Light Elves"), is home of the Light Elves.

Attestations

Álfheim as an abode of the Elves is mentioned only twice in Old Norse texts.

The eddic poem Grímnismál describes twelve divine dwellings beginning the stanza 5 with:
Ýdalir call they     the place where Ull
A hall for himself hath set;
And Álfheim the gods     to Frey once gave
As a tooth-gift in ancient times.

A tooth-gift was a gift given to an infant on the cutting of the first tooth.

In the 12th century eddic prose Gylfaginning, Snorri Sturluson relates it in the stanza 17 as the first of a series of abodes in heaven:
That which is called Álfheim is one, where dwell the peoples called ljósálfar [Light Elves]; but the dökkálfar [Dark Elves] dwell down in the earth, and they are unlike in appearance, but by far more unlike in nature. The Light-elves are fairer to look upon than the sun, but the Dark-elves are blacker than pitch.
The account later, in speaking of a hall in the Highest Heaven called Gimlé that shall survive when heaven and earth have died, explains:
It is said that another heaven is to the southward and upward of this one, and it is called Andlang [Andlangr 'Endlong'] but the third heaven is yet above that, and it is called Vídbláin [Vídbláinn 'Wide-blue'] and in that heaven we think this abode is. But we believe that none but Light-Elves inhabit these mansions now.
It is not indicated whether these heavens are identical to Álfheim or distinct. Some texts read Vindbláin (Vindbláinn 'Wind-blue') instead of Vídbláin.

Modern commentators speculate (or sometimes state as fact) that Álfheim was one of the nine worlds (heima) mentioned in stanza 2 of the eddic poem Völuspá.

See also
 Fairyland, a folkloric location sometimes referred to as Elfame
  Svartálfar (black elves)
 Alfheimbjerg

Sources

External links

Locations in Norse mythology
Saga locations
Elves
Freyr